In the Ultimate Marvel universe, the Hulk (Bruce Banner) is a fictional character. Loosely based on the regular Marvel Universe character of the same name, he first appeared, in flashback, in Mark Millar and Bryan Hitch's Ultimates (1st series) #2 (April 2002).  Although he did appear in a two-part story in Ultimate Marvel Team-Up, written by Brian Michael Bendis and drawn by Phil Hester, it is generally considered to be out of continuity due to conflicting designs and characters; however, references made in the first issues of The Ultimates and the Ultimate Origins could be taken to reconcile some of this.

Whereas the Marvel Universe Hulks are characters in their own right, Millar's Ultimate Universe Hulk is intended purely as a mirror of Banner – a creature of pure rage and id, which simply incorporates the base emotions that Ultimate Banner represses, and amplifies them to absurd degrees. Unlike previous versions of the Hulk, he is primarily a villainous menace than a superhero and is also cannibalistic.

Fictional character biography

Origin
Dr. Robert Bruce Banner was one of the leading scientists in the United States. He had a scientist named Leonard Williams as his teacher.

He was later among the scientists that are used to recreate the Super-Soldier Formula that created Captain America. Bruce Banner is shown to have been hired by the U.S. Government and General Nick Fury as part of a project to secretly recreate the Super Soldier Serum. At a covert lab in Dover, New Jersey, Bruce works alongside fellow scientists, Hank Pym, Franklin Storm, father of Sue and Johnny Storm, and Richard Parker, father of Peter Parker. Bruce believes that he has come up with the correct formula for the serum, but needs to test it out. Eager to try his results on a human subject, Banner synthesizes his serum and injects himself with it. The serum turns him into the Hulk for the very first time. Banner goes on a rampage inside the laboratory and eventually destroys the entire complex, nearly killing Richard Parker, along with his wife Mary, who had brought an infant Peter along with her to visit Richard. Years later, Hulk laid waste to Chelsea Piers before he could be subdued by Spider-Man and taken into custody.

Banner and Henry Pym were both hired by S.H.I.E.L.D. to create post-human soldiers for S.H.I.E.L.D.'s Ultimates, with Banner focusing on the Super-Soldier formula responsible for Captain America, and Henry Pym experimenting with his Giant-Man formula. Whereas Pym found success and celebrity with "Giant-Man", Banner found himself unable to crack the Super-Soldier formula. Classifying himself a failure and suffering ridicule at the hands of Pym, Banner took some of the recently rediscovered Captain America's blood, combined it with his Hulk formula, and injected it. Banner rationalized his decision by saying that turning himself into a monster gave the Ultimates a villain to fight, thereby justifying their existence at a time when they were accused of being an enormous multi-billion dollar waste of government resources. Before lapsing into unconsciousness however, Banner confessed that "honest-to-God truth of the matter" is that he simply "just missed being big."

Shortly afterwards, Banner transformed into a sociopathic grey-skinned Hulk that channeled and amplified Banner's hidden emotions, unleashing the darkest depths of his id. The Hulk proceeded to track down and pursue Betty Ross, the object of Bruce Banner's affection who, because of relationship problems with Banner, was courting the favor of Hollywood film star Freddie Prinze, Jr. that night, and inadvertently boasted about it to Banner over the phone shortly before his transformation. During his rampage and cross-town pursuit of the fleeing Betty Ross, The Hulk informed Betty that he was "horny as Hell" and destroyed everything in his path, indiscriminately killing hundreds of people in the process. After rendering Giant-Man unconscious and overpowering Iron Man, Captain America, and Thor, who were all dispatched to stop his rampage, The Hulk changed back into Banner after the Wasp entered his skull through the ear canal and fired her bio-electric sting directly into his brain. Upon regaining consciousness, Banner was promptly knocked unconscious, restrained and shuttled away to S.H.I.E.L.D., the connection between him and the Ultimate Hulk covered up. Later, after being subdued by the Ultimates, an examination on Banner's blood revealed that the latest Super-Soldier Formula he took has placed a more permanent effect on Banner. The "Hulk cells" were not disappearing like they did after the first time Banner transformed, showing that the new Super-Soldier Formula Banner took would forever keep the Hulk within him.

Homeland Security
After his rampage, Banner spent a number of months in a cell specifically designed to withstand the Hulk's fury, with Anti-Hulk serum administered to him on a continuous basis. Amidst the Chitauri's assault on Earth and their takeover of S.H.I.E.L.D. and the United States Armed Forces, General Fury quickly mobilized an army and attacked the alien base in Arizona. During his battle with Herr Kleiser, a Chitauri agent capable of absorbing and administering enormous physical damage, Captain America, with all other tactical options exhausted, gave the order for "the Weapon of Last Resort" and gave "Permission to traumatize Banner," who was in a helicopter with a military escort hovering over the S.H.I.E.L.D. battlefield. The delicate procedure of traumatizing a 90-pound scientist simply amounted to throwing him out of the chopper in hopes that his anger would overcome the effects of the anti-Hulk serum coursing through his veins. It did. The Hulk's first course of action was to bodyslam Captain America into the concrete to pay him back for breaking Banner's jaw after the first Hulk transformation in Manhattan. Captain America immediately pointed out Herr Kleiser, declaring that he had been "all over Betty" while Banner was in his solitary cell. Not one to be overshadowed by a skinny German Nazi, the Hulk promptly pounded Kleiser to a pulp and even ate him. While Hulk was dining on Kleiser, Captain America manipulated him once more by calling down to him, telling Hulk that the Chitauri alien fleet had called him a "sissy-boy" and asked if the Hulk intended to let the aliens get away with such an insult. In a most vigorous defense of his heterosexuality, Hulk leaped a mile into the air, ripping apart the entire airborne alien fleet that clouded the sky, all the while proclaiming that "Hulk no Sissy Boy...HULK STRAIGHT!" Even after destroying the entire fleet and saving what remained of the day, the Hulk was full of adrenaline and rage, and needed to be sedated. Hawkeye, the marksman, was called in to take him down with an adamantium-tipped syringe full of anti-Hulk serum. Hawkeye did, but barely succeeded since Hulk seemed to be impervious to the antidote Hawkeye shot into Hulk before he finally passed out. While Banner returned to normal while in containment in S.H.I.E.L.D., his caretakers monitored him closely. Because of Herr Kleiser's shapeshifting abilities, Banner's stool were collected and properly disposed of after the battle, to rule out the possibility of Kleiser reconstituting himself in a cunning, if disgusting, way.

When Magneto attacked the Triskelion's lockup during the "Ultimate War" series, power went down for the entire facility. The Hulk was said to have eaten six members of the nursing staff in the chaos.

During the "Ultimate Six" storyline, the Triskelion was attacked by Electro and the Green Goblin, but Banner was later reported by Iron Man to have "fallen asleep reading a magazine" and was promptly sedated for a week, just in case.

Banner remained in his cell for a year, with very few Hulk episodes; during one such transformation, he sat on the couch and watched Curb Your Enthusiasm until he changed back. The few visitors he received included Hank Pym, demonstrating his new "Ant Man" technology. Shortly thereafter, he learned from the national news that somebody had leaked top-secret information to the press regarding the Hulk/Banner connection. S.H.I.E.L.D. hired lawyer Matt Murdock to try to avoid the death penalty for 800-plus murder counts by bringing up the important things Banner had done in the interests of national security, and his work for the Ultimates. During jury deliberation, Banner received a visit from General Nick Fury, who told him that the case had been dismissed, and presented him with a bottle of champagne. Eagerly drinking his first drink as a free man, Banner passed out – the bottle had been drugged by Hank Pym at Fury's request – and awakened much later on the deck of an aircraft carrier, with a one-megaton nuclear weapon nearby. Fortunately for his well-being, he transformed into the Hulk right before the nuclear device was detonated. Later, Banner anonymously calls Pym from a public telephone to thank him for deliberately botching the dose before Banner decided to go into hiding. It is not clear if Pym deliberately botched the dose, or was merely incompetent in his research.

Bruce Banner later appears in Washington D.C. before one of the Crimson Dynamo's giant duplicates, letting it step on him, all the while muttering to himself about being "in touch with his inner sociopath". The Hulk appears in the next panel, lifting the robot with both hands and then ripping it in two, finishing the issue with a declaration of, "NOW BRING IT ON!" He then continues to aid the Ultimates against the Liberators by defeating, dismembering, and finally eating the Abomination.

Ultimate Wolverine Vs. Hulk

Some time after Banner's disappearance, strange occurrences across Europe and Asia reported. General Fury started piecing together the evidence and concluded that despite their distance from one another, they were all related. The discovery of feces in Tibet belonging to Banner confirmed that he had survived his execution. Since S.H.I.E.L.D. was in charge of executing Banner in a very public way, they acted to cover up their error by contracting James "Logan" Howlett (Wolverine) to track Banner down and eliminate him. Logan arrives at a rural village in Tibet and discovers that all the women have been kidnapped. He eventually makes his way to a beautiful but derelict palace. The Hulk (decked in Tibetan robes and beads) has taken up residence here with the kidnapped women as his concubines. The Hulk is annoyed at being interrupted and he and Wolverine fight. After an intense struggle, the Hulk physically rips Wolverine's body in half and hurls his legs four miles up a mountain, leaving Logan's torso to freeze in the snow.

Issue #2 reveals, in flashback, that Bruce Banner, after travelling through France, Ireland and India, finally treks to Tibet, to seek the wisdom of the Panchen Lama who he hopes can reveal the true relationship behind Banner and the Hulk. It is here that the Hulk resides prior to Logan's intrusion.

Later appearances
He then appeared together with Iron Man in their own mini-series titled Ultimate Human, focusing on Bruce Banner approaching Tony Stark about the possibility of using the Iron Man nanites to control the Hulk transformations. The Leader is introduced as Pete Wisdom, a scientist after the blood of both men, for use in the creation of a superhuman. This series depicts the Hulk's physiology as almost infinitely adaptive to adverse conditions, including simulations of hostile extraterrestrial environments such as the surface of the planet Venus. It also described him as generating carbon Fullerenes in his skin structure, adding to his durability.

A naked Hulk comes into a restaurant demanding food. Princess Zarda who is already at the restaurant fights and defeats the Hulk. After the fight, the two form a bond and go to another restaurant before renting a motel room and having sex.

During the "Ultimatum" storyline, the Hulk appears in New York and is convinced by Spider-Man to help him rescue people. When demons start appearing they go to the home of Doctor Strange, only to learn that his body had been possessed by Nightmare. He then starts to torture them. Hulk in response heats the Orb of Acmantata, which causes an explosion. He survives and is recruited by the remaining Ultimates and X-Men to stop Magneto. In Magneto's Citadel, he and Colossus are tasked with destroying some of the citadel's machinery. They try to stop Mystique and Sabretooth from escaping, but fail. Hulk survives Ultimatum and is later seen in Ultimate Comics: X in a soup kitchen as Bruce Banner in New York. He is convinced by Karen Grant to be their "enforcer" in a new team sponsored by former Director Nick Fury.

During the European crisis involving the Children of Tomorrow, Hulk was convinced by S.H.I.E.L.D. Agent Flumm to attack the Children of Tomorrow in exchange for the safety of Betty Ross, currently in custody. Hulk was unleashed in Children's base called The City, but the Maker managed to calm him down and convince him that he was being used. In that moment, the US Government launched an ineffective nuclear attack on the City, and the Children detonate an anti-matter bomb in Washington, D.C. in retaliation. When the Ultimates finally turned the tide, the Maker injected the Hulk with the Giant-Man serum, turning him into a giant juggernaut, although he was defeated and put into sedated custody beneath the Triskelion once more.

Bruce was freed by the mysterious woman called Kang, and convinced him to steal the Infinity Gems with which he battled the Ultimates. After the arrival of escapee Reed Richards, the heroes escaped, but Captain America decided to be left behind in order to stop the villains, although he was defeated by Thor.

When Maker merged all realities in order to help Eternity to fight the First Firmament, Hulk is among the Ultimates members that are revived. It was shown that Hulk didn't retain his intelligence and referred to himself in the third person. When the Ultimates of Earth-616 arrived on Counter-Earth to confront Maker for his actions, he had the Earth-1610 Ultimates fight the Earth-616 Ultimates where Hulk was thrown out of the building by Blue Marvel. Eventually, Hulk and the rest of the Earth-1610 Ultimates decided that there was no reason to fight the Earth-616 Ultimates which resulted in Maker killing the Earth-1610 Captain America. After aiding the Earth-616 Ultimates into giving Eternity the power to defeat the First Firmament, Hulk and the rest of the Earth-1610 Ultimates left to pursue Maker.

After Earth-1610 was restored, Hulk was seen with the Avengers where they help Spider-Man fight Goblin.

Powers and abilities
Banner's powers are a result of his Hulk formula combined with Captain America's blood, which causes him to transform when under stress into a gigantic monstrous form that is virtually impervious to harm, and which possesses vast physical strength and stamina. His strength appears to be peerless in the Ultimate universe, as he tosses heavy-hitters such as Iron Man and Thor around like dolls and ripped the Adamantium needle prepared for him like a toothpick. He also tore Wolverine in half despite the presence of his Adamantium laced skeleton. He is also tough enough to survive a nuclear detonation, seeing as how he is still alive after the attempted execution.

Hulk can regenerate tissue and broken bones almost instantly, making him an almost impossible enemy to defeat; so far only two defeats have been witnessed, both involving forced transition back to Banner. Firstly where Hulk was suffered Wasp's "stings" directly to his frontal lobes, followed by impact trauma incurred from a height upwards of five thousand feet.  Secondly, Hulk can be forcibly transformed back to Banner form through direct injection of a serum created by Bruce Banner himself; injection is possible only via adamantium needle that can either be directly applied, or fired into the target. The second option was employed by Hawkeye (under General Fury's command) after the alien invasion had been defeated at the end of Ultimates vol. 1, in the aptly-named issue "How I Learned To Love The Hulk".

Personality and behavior 
This Hulk, like many Ultimate Marvel characters, has base similarities to his mainstream Marvel Universe counterpart coupled with differences. He is very angry and has not shown much intelligence, like the Savage Hulk. However, the Ultimate Marvel version of Hulk is a lot more vicious and violent than his mainstream counterpart. For example, Hulk has ripped Ultimate Wolverine in half and ripped off Herr Kleiser's head. Further, he once threatened to rip out Hank Pym's skull and use it as a toilet. This Hulk is also just as much more sexual. On many occasions, Hulk has yelled out to Betty, telling her how "horny" he is and he also surrounded himself with beautiful women in Tibet. Finally, the Ultimate version of Hulk is a cannibal, as demonstrated in Ultimate Wolverine Vs. Hulk #2, where the Hulk devours his farm coworkers for making fun of Banner's being a vegan and questioning his sexuality.

In other media
The Hulk appears in Ultimate Avengers with Bruce Banner voiced by Michael Massee and Hulk voiced by Fred Tatasciore. In the movie, he appears as a scientist for the Avengers. It was revealed that the Hulk ruins Banner's work, identity, and his relationships. In order to help the Avengers, Banner planned to use the Super Soldier serum to take control of the Hulk. According to him, transmutations can be controlled by the serum. As Banner transforms into the Hulk while breathing a dose of the serum, he successfully take control of the Hulk, and speaks while in that form. Unfortunately, while fighting the Chitauri aliens, Banner loses control, and became mindless. Betty was able to inject him a serum, and was transformed back. After a while, Banner was now imprisoned.

The Hulk appears in the sequel of the movie titled Ultimate Avengers: Rise of The Panther, with Bruce Banner voiced again by Michael Massee and Hulk voiced again by Fred Tatasciore. Banner was still imprisoned and was forced to watch of the Hulk's actions. He found the reason why he lost control of his Hulk form which he wouldn't tell anyone but Betty. It turned out some of the gamma from the Chitauri's ship caused Banner to lose control of his Hulk form. In the end, he transformed and escapes during the Chitauri attack, though he does get one last look at Betty before fleeing.

The MCU version of Bruce Banner is experimented on in a similar way to his Ultimate counterpart. Although, his transformation follows the same rules as his prime incarnation in which the Hulk and Banner are separate personalities.

References

External links
 Hulk (Earth-1610) at Marvel Wiki

Characters created by Mark Millar
Comics characters introduced in 2001
Fictional cannibals
Fictional characters with alter egos
Fictional characters with nuclear or radiation abilities
Fictional characters with superhuman durability or invulnerability
Fictional nuclear physicists
Fictional physicians
Marvel Comics mutates
Marvel Comics characters who are shapeshifters
Marvel Comics characters who can move at superhuman speeds
Marvel Comics characters with accelerated healing
Marvel Comics characters with superhuman strength
Marvel Comics male supervillains
Marvel Comics scientists
Ultimate Marvel characters